The IPSC Slovak Rifle Championship is an IPSC level 3 championship held once a year by the Slovakian Association for Dynamic Shooting.

Champions 
The following is a list of current and previous champions.

Overall category

Lady category

Junior category

Senior category

Super Senior category

References 

Match Results - 2015 IPSC Slovak Rifle Championship
Match Results - 2016 IPSC Slovak Rifle Championship
Match Results - 2017 IPSC Slovak Rifle Championship

IPSC shooting competitions
National shooting championships
Slovakia sport-related lists
Shooting competitions in Slovakia